is a Japanese football player.

Club statistics

References

External links

1981 births
Living people
Fukuoka University alumni
Association football people from Mie Prefecture
Japanese footballers
J1 League players
J2 League players
Japan Football League players
Sagan Tosu players
Gainare Tottori players
Veertien Mie players
Matsue City FC players
Association football defenders